Daniel Osinachi Egwim (born 25 August 1989) is a Nigerian former footballer.

Notes

1989 births
Living people
Nigerian footballers
Association football forwards
Sunshine Stars F.C. players
FC Inter Turku players
Veikkausliiga players
Nigerian expatriate footballers
Expatriate footballers in Finland
Nigerian expatriate sportspeople in Finland